David Ortega Pitarch (born 20 July 1979 in Castellón de la Plana, Castellón) is a freestyle and backstroke swimmer from Spain. He swam for Spain at the 2000 Summer Olympics; the World Championships in 1998, 2003, 2005, and 2007; the Mediterranean Games in 2001 and 2005; and the European Championships in 2000 and 2004.

At the 2000 European Championships, he won the 100m Backstroke.

References

External links
 
 
 
 

1979 births
Living people
Spanish male backstroke swimmers
Spanish male freestyle swimmers
Olympic swimmers of Spain
Swimmers at the 2000 Summer Olympics
European Aquatics Championships medalists in swimming
Mediterranean Games medalists in swimming
Mediterranean Games silver medalists for Spain
Mediterranean Games bronze medalists for Spain
Swimmers at the 2005 Mediterranean Games
21st-century Spanish people